

Group A









Group B









References

External links
 FIBA Archive

EuroBasket Women 1989
EuroBasket Women squads